Abbas Mousavi is an Iranian career diplomat. He has been spokesman for the Ministry of Foreign Affairs of Iran since 2019. In August 2020, he was appointed as an ambassador of Iran to Azerbaijan.

References

Iranian diplomats
Living people
Place of birth missing (living people)
People from Mahmudabad, Mazandaran
1971 births